The enzyme actinomycin lactonase (EC 3.1.1.39) catalyzes the reaction

actinomycin + H2O  actinomycinic monolactone

This enzyme belongs to the family of hydrolases, specifically those acting on carboxylic ester bonds.  The systematic name is actinomycin lactonohydrolase.

References

 

EC 3.1.1
Enzymes of unknown structure